Scotts Corner or variants may refer to the following places in the United States:

Scotts Corner, California
Scotts Corner, Delaware
Scott Corner, Indiana
Scotts Corner, Minnesota
Scotts Corner, New Jersey
Scotts Corner, New York, in Orange County
Scotts Corners, New York, in Westchester County
Scotts Corner, Virginia

See also
Scotch Corner